Daniel Paul Wright (born April 3, 1991) is an American former professional baseball pitcher. He has played in Major League Baseball (MLB) for the Cincinnati Reds and Los Angeles Angels.

Career

Cincinnati Reds
Wright attended Bartlett High School in Bartlett, Tennessee, and played college baseball at Arkansas State University, along with two summers for the Newport Gulls of the NECBL in 2011 and 2012. He was selected by the Cincinnati Reds in the 10th round of the 2013 Major League Baseball draft.

Wright was promoted to the Reds and made his major league debut on May 24, 2016, losing to the Los Angeles Dodgers.

Los Angeles Angels
Wright was claimed off waivers by the Los Angeles Angels on September 4, 2016. He was designated for assignment by the Angels on September 4, 2017.

Second Stint with Reds
Wright signed a minor league deal with the Cincinnati Reds for the 2018 season, though he did not get called up to the majors and became a free agent after the season.

References

External links

1991 births
Living people
People from Bartlett, Tennessee
Baseball players from Tennessee
Major League Baseball pitchers
Cincinnati Reds players
Los Angeles Angels players
Arkansas State Red Wolves baseball players
Billings Mustangs players
Dayton Dragons players
Bakersfield Blaze players
Pensacola Blue Wahoos players
Louisville Bats players
Salt Lake Bees players